Kraft Television Theatre is an American anthology drama television series running from 1947 to 1958. It began May 7, 1947 on NBC, airing at 7:30pm on Wednesday evenings until December of that year. It first promoted MacLaren's Imperial Cheese, which was advertised nowhere else. In January 1948, it moved to 9pm on Wednesdays, continuing in that timeslot until 1958. Initially produced by the J. Walter Thompson advertising agency, the live hour-long series offered television plays with new stories and new characters each week, in addition to adaptations of such classics as A Christmas Carol and Alice in Wonderland.  The program was broadcast live from Studio 8-H at 30 Rockefeller Plaza, currently the home of Saturday Night Live.

Beginning October 1953, ABC added a separate series (also titled Kraft Television Theatre), created to promote Kraft's new Cheez Whiz product. This series ran for sixteen months, telecast on Thursday evenings at 9:30pm, until January 1955. After Kraft cancelled the second show, the second show changed its sponsor to become Pond's Theatre on ABC-TV from March 1955, while the original Kraft Theatre continued on NBC-TV.

Background
A prestige show for NBC, it launched the careers of more than a few actors, directors and playwrights, including future Emmy-winning and Academy Award-nominated actress Hope Lange.

Actors on the series included James Dean, Janet De Gore, Colleen Dewhurst, Anne Francis, Lee Grant, Helen Hayes, Jack Lemmon, Grace Kelly, Jack Klugman, Cloris Leachman, Sam Levene, Patrick McVey, Michael Higgins, John Newland, Paul Newman, Leslie Nielsen, Anthony Perkins, Judson Pratt, silent film icon Esther Ralston, Lee Remick, George C. Scott, Rod Steiger, Joan Tompkins (her first television role), Grace Carney and Joanne Woodward. Announcers for the show were Ed Herlihy (1947–1955) and Charles Stark (1955). In 1958, young performers Martin Huston and Zina Bethune appeared in "This Property Is Condemned", based on a Tennessee Williams play, the last show of Kraft Television Theatre.

Directors for the series included Sidney Lumet, Robert Altman, George Roy Hill, Fielder Cook, and John Boulting, and the many contributing writers included Rod Serling, William Templeton and JP Miller. Serling won an Emmy for scripting Patterns (January 12, 1955), the best remembered episode of the series. The drama had such an impact that it made television history by staging a second live encore performance three weeks later and was developed as a feature film, also titled Patterns.

In April 1958, Kraft sold the rights to David Susskind's Talent Associates, which revamped the series as Kraft Mystery Theatre. Under that title, it continued until September 1958. However, this eventually evolved into the 1963 filmed series Kraft Suspense Theatre, which concentrated exclusively on original dramas written for television, not on adaptations.

Between 1947 and 1958, the Kraft Television Theatre presented more than 650 comedies and dramas. The series finished #14 in the Nielsen ratings for the 1950–1951 season, #23 for 1951-1952 and #21 for 1953–1954.

Episode status
Excerpts from several 1947 episodes and part of a reel of 1947 television clips are held by the Library of Congress. In addition, the Library of Congress holds a large number of complete episodes, including five from 1948. The American Heritage Center  has a number of scripts from various episodes for the years 1947, 1948, and 1949 in the Edmund C. Rice papers.  These scripts, though authored by various people, were edited by Rice.

Episodes

References

External links

Kraft Mystery Theatre at CVTA with episode list

1947 American television series debuts
1958 American television series endings
1940s American anthology television series
1950s American anthology television series
1940s American drama television series
1950s American drama television series
Black-and-white American television shows
English-language television shows
NBC original programming
Kraft Foods
Television series by Talent Associates
 
Television shows filmed in New York City